Nuevo Ideal  is one of the 39 municipalities of Durango, in north-western Mexico. The municipal seat lies at Nuevo Ideal. 

Nuevo Ideal was formerly known as "Estación Patos," and part of the Canatlán Municipality.  

As of 2010, the municipality had a total population of 26,092.

As of 2010, the city of Nuevo Ideal had a population of 10,876. Other than the city of Nuevo Ideal, the municipality had 182 localities, the largest of which (with 2010 populations in parentheses) were: Esfuerzos Unidos (1,083) and Guatimapé (1,083), classified as rural.

References 

Municipalities of Durango